Devil's pincushion is a common name for several cacti and may refer to:

Echinocactus parryi, native to Chihuahua
Echinocactus texensis, native to New Mexico, Oklahoma, and Texas